Falc S.p.A. is an Italian footwear manufacturer founded in Civitanova Marche (MC) in 1974.
The name Falc derives from ‘Falchetti’, a historical name by which the inhabitants of the upper part of the town were known.

The Falcotto line of shoes, created for children who crawl and toddlers, was introduced by Falc in 1982.
Six years later in 1988, this company of Marche Region launched the Naturino line on the market whose characterising features are the ‘sand effect’ system and a slip-out insole.

In 1989 Falc acquired the Moschino license for children’s footwear.

Falc entered the field of footwear for adults in 2005 when it introduced the Moschino’s Men’s collection and presented the Voile Blanche unisex line.

Today, Falc produces more than 2 million pairs of shoes a year and in recent years the company has opened 5000 sales outlets, 50 exclusive stores, factories in different countries and branch offices in the United States, Canada, Singapore, China, France and Germany.

See also

 Baldinini
 Stefano Bemer
 Bettanin & Venturi
 Bontoni
 Bottega Veneta
 Braccialini
 Brunello Cucinelli
 Calzaturificio fratelli soldini
 Diesel (brand)
 Dolce & Gabbana
 Fendi
 Fiorucci
 Furla
 Garolini
 Genny
 Geox
 Golden Goose
 Gravati
 Gucci
 Iceberg
 Krizia
 Luigi Voltan
 Bruno Magli
 Marina Rinaldi
 Moon Boot
 Cesare Paciotti
 Pal Zileri
 Pinko
 Prada
 Ferragamo
 Sergio Rossi
 Superga
 Tod's
 Valextra
 Versace
 Vibram
 Made in Italy

References

External links 
 

Shoe brands
Shoe companies of Italy
Clothing companies established in 1974
Italian companies established in 1974
Italian brands
Companies based in le Marche
Civitanova Marche
Children's clothing brands